This article lists various statistics related to Atletico Marte.

All stats accurate as of 24 February 2023.

Honours
As of 8 February 2022,  Atletico Marte have won 8 Primera División, 1 Segunda División, 1 Copa El Salvador, 1 UNCAF Champions' Cup and 1 CONCACAF Champions' Cup trophies.

Domestic

Leagues
Primera División and predecessors 
 Champions (8): 1955, 1956, 1957, 1969, 1970, 1980–81, 1982, 1985
Segunda División and predecessors
 Champions (1): 2008 Apertura
 Promotion Play-off Winners: 2008–2009

Cups
 Copa El Salvador and predecessors 
 Champions (1) : 1991

CONCACAF
CONCACAF Champions' Cup and predecessors 
 Runners-up (1): 1981
CONCACAF Cup Winners Cup and predecessors 
 Champions (1): 1991

UNCAF
UNCAF Champions' Cup/Recopa de la UNCAF and predecessors 
 Champions (1): 1991 Recopa de la UNCAF

Youth Team honours
Primera División Reserves:
Champions (3): Apertura 1998, Clausura 2010, Apertura 2011

Achievements

Copa El Salvador

Details
It was played between previous league champion LA firpo and regular season champion Atletico Marte.
Atletico Marte won the match 2-1 to secure their 1st Torneo de Copa El Salvador.
They were coached by Armando Contreras Palma and his assistant Juan Ramon Paredes. The following players were listed and played in the game for Atletico Marte: Lorenzo Hernandez, Romeo Lozano, Misael Rodriguez, Manuel Flores, Wilfredo Figueroa, Fernando Lazo, Manrique Torres, Santanna Cartagena, Saul Garay, Guillermo Flamenco, Rene Toledo, Brazilian Nildeson, Orsi Chicas and Manuel Diaz.

Recopa de UNCAF/1991 Copa Centroamericano
The matches featured Atletico Marte (Champion of Copa El Salvador), Comunicaciones (Champion of Guatemala), Saprissa (Champion of Costa Rica) and Real Esteli (Champion of Nicaragua). Atletico Marte won their first title Copa Centroamericano with two win and one draw. They were coached by Uruguayan Carlos Jurado and his assistant Juan Ramon Paredes. The following players were listed and played in the game for Atletico Marte: Efrain Alas, Uruguayan Jose Mario Figueroa and Jose Luis Cardozo, Peruvian Agustin Castillo, Martin Velasco, Rene Toledo, Oscar Arbizu

Recopa de CONCACAF
The matches featured Atletico Marte (Champion of Copa Centroamericano), Comunicaciones (Runner up Copa Centroamericano), Racing Gonaïves (Champion of the Caribbean) and Universidad de Guadalajara (Champion of North America). Atletico Marte won their first CONCACAF title (1991 CONCACAF Cup Winners Cup with two win and one loss. They were coached by Juan Ramon Paredes and his assistant TBD. The following players were listed and played in the game for Atletico Marte: Efrain Alas, Wilfredo Iraheta, Marcial Turcios, Honduran Pastor Martinez, Romeo Lozano, Santana Cartagena, Carlos Castro Borja, Peruvian Agustin Castillo, Ricardo Garcia, Colombian Henry Velez, Uruguayan Jose Luis Cardozo, Oscar Arbizu, Guillermo Flamenco

International representation

Historical Matches

Individual awards

Award winners
Top Goalscorer (5)
The following players have won the Goalscorer while playing for Marte:
 Sergio Méndez -1974-75
 Wilfredo Huezo (13)  – 1981 
 Jose "Mandingo" Rivas (11)  – 1985 
 Rodinei Martins (24)  – 1992-93 
 Gonzalo Mazzia (13)  – Apertura 2013

Goalscorers 
Most goals scored : TBD - TBD
Most League goals: TBD - 
Most League goals in a season: TBD - TBD, Primera Division, TBD
Most goals scored by a Marte player in a match: TBD - TBD v. TBD (Marte 7-2 UES), Day Month Year
Most goals scored by a Marte player in an International match: TBD - TBD  v. TBD, Day Month Year
Most goals scored in CONCACAF competition: TBD - tbd, tbd

All-time top goalscorers 

<small>Note: Players in bold text are still active with Atletico Marte.</small>

Historical goals

 Players 

AppearancesCompetitive, professional matches only including substitution, number of appearances as a substitute appears in brackets.Last updated - 

Other appearances records
 Youngest first-team player:  –  TBD v TBD, Primera Division, Day Month Year
 Oldest post-Second World War player:  –  TBD v TBD, Primera Division, Day Month Year
 Most appearances in Primera Division: TBD –  TBD
 Most appearances in Copa Presidente: TBD –  TBD
 Most appearances in International competitions: TBD –  TBD
 Most appearances in CONCACAF competitions: TBD –  TBD
 Most appearances in UNCAF competitions: TBD  –  TBD
 Most appearances in CONCACAF Champions League: TBD –  TBD
 Most appearances in UNCAF Copa: TBD  TBD
 Most appearances in FIFA Club World Cup: 2

 Zózimo

 Most appearances as a foreign player in all competitions: TBD –  TBD
 Most appearances as a foreign player in Primera Division: TBD –  TBD
 Most consecutive League appearances: TBD –  TBD – from Month Day, Year at Month Day, Year
 Shortest appearance: –

Records

Scorelines
Record League victory: 8-1 v Aguila, Primera division, 5 December 1993
Record League Defeat: TBD-TBD v  TBD, Primera division, Day Month Year
Record Cup victory: TBD–TBD v TBD, Presidente Cup, TBD
Record CONCACAF Championship Victory: TBD–TBD v TBD, TBD, TBD
Record CONCACAF Championship defeat: TBD–TBD v TBD, TBD, TBD
Record UNCAF Victory: 5–1 v Coban Imperial, TBD, 1979
Record UNCAF defeat: 1–5 v C.S. Herediano, 1972

Sequences
Most wins in a row: TBD, TBD - TBD
Most home wins in a row (all competitions): TBD, TBD– TBD
Most home league wins in a row: TBD, TBD - TBD
Most away wins in a row: TBD, TBD – TBD
Most draws in a row: TBD, TBD
Most home draws in a row: TBD, TBD
Most away draws in a row: TBD, TBD
Most defeats in a row: 8, TBD
Most home defeats in a row: TBD, TBD
Most away defeats in a row: TBD, TBD
Longest unbeaten run: 20, 1985 Season 
Longest unbeaten run at home: TBD, TBD
Longest unbeaten run away: TBD, TBD
Longest winless run: TBD,  TBD – TBD
Longest winless run at home: TBD, TBD – TBD
Longest winless run away: TBD, TBD - TBD

Seasonal
Most goals in all competitions in a season: TBD - TBD
Most League goals in a season: TBD - TBD
Fewest league goals conceded in a season: 6 - 1981
Most points in a season: TBD - TBD, TBD
Most points in a season (Apertura/Clausura): 35 points - Apertura 2013, 9 wins, 8 draw and 1 loss
Most League wins in a season: TBD – TBD
Most League wins in a season (Apertura/Clausura): 9 wins – Apertura 2013
Most home League wins in a season: TBD – TBD
Most away League wins in a season: TBD – TBD

Internationals
Most international caps (total while at club): TBD - TBD - El Salvador

Attendances
Highest home attendance: TBD, TBD
Highest away attendance: TBD v TBD, TBD, TBD, TBD

Other
 Seasons appearance: 69, (1950-2002, 2009–present)
 First coach that won three championships in a row in El Salvador: Salvadoran Conrado Miranda with Atletico Marte in 1955-57.
 Most points in a season:  points, Atletico Marte (TBD)
 First Foreign Player to be signed by Atletico Marte: Costa Rican Ernesto Mora Varga, 1950-1951
 Fastest goalscorer:

InternationalsThe following players represented their countries while playing for Atletico Marte (the figure in brackets is the number of caps gained while a Marte player. Many of these players also gained caps while at other clubs.) Figures for active players (in bold) last updated 2014''
  

Chile
 José Moris

Costa Rica
 José Luis Soto (1965)

El Salvador
 Ovidio López
 Yohalmo Aurora
 Manuel Garay
 Carlos Guerra
 Albert Fay
 Raúl Magaña
 Carlos Felipe Cañadas
 Carlos Antonio Meléndez 
 Luis Guevara Mora 
 Mauricio Alvarenga
 Ramon Fagoaga
 Norberto Huezo
 Luis Regalado
 Conrado Miranda
 Arturo Albarran
 Celio Rodríguez

Equatorial Guinea
 Deogracias Abaga Edu Mangue

Guatemala
 Gabriel Urriola

Panama
Luis Ernesto Tapia

Paraguay
Jorge Lino Romero

Mexico
Manuel Camacho

Peru
Agustín Castillo
Fidel Suárez

Sierra Leone
Abdul Thompson Conteh

Uruguay
Raúl Esnal 
Alejandro Larrea

Notes

References

External links
 

Football in El Salvador